Terezie Brzková (11 January 1875 – 19 November 1966) was a Czechoslovak film actress. She appeared in 28 films between 1939 and 1959. She is buried at the Vyšehrad Cemetery in Prague.

Selected filmography
 The Magic House (1939)
 Grandmother (1940)
 Barbora Hlavsová (1942)
 The Respectable Ladies of Pardubice (1944)
 The Girl from Beskydy Mountains (1944)
 Černí myslivci (1944)
 Premonition (1947)
 Lost in the Suburbs (1948)
 Temno (1950)

References

External links
 

1875 births
1966 deaths
Czechoslovak actresses
People from Kolín
Burials at Vyšehrad Cemetery